Creator is something or someone who brings something into being.

Books and comics
 Creators (comics), characters in the Marvel Comics universe
 Creators (Guyver), characters in the manga Bio Booster Armor Guyver
 The Creator (novelette), a science fiction novelette by Clifford D. Simak
 The Creator (poetry collection), a 2000 poetry collection by Dejan Stojanović
 The Creators, a 1992 book by Daniel Boorstin

Film
 Creator, a 1985 film starring Peter O'Toole, Vincent Spano, Mariel Hemingway, and Virginia Madsen

Television
 A television program creator develops the characters, concept, and format for a television show.

Music
 Creator (album), a 1988 album by The Lemonheads
 "Creator" (song), a 2008 song by Santigold
 Kreator, a German thrash metal band

Religion
 Creator deity, a deity responsible for the creation of the Earth, world, and universe
 Great Spirit, or similar deity in Native American religions is often known as "The Creator"
 The Creator, 35th Sura of the Qur'an
An adherent of Creativity

See also 
 Creation (disambiguation)